Ab Barik (also Romanized as Āb Bārīk, Āb-e Bārīk, and Āb-i-Bārīk; also known as Sefīd Savār) is a village in Howmeh-ye Dehgolan Rural District, in the Central District of Dehgolan County, Kurdistan Province, Iran. At the 2006 census, its population was 367, in 80 families. The village is populated by Kurds.

References 

Towns and villages in Dehgolan County
Kurdish settlements in Kurdistan Province